Nutana may refer to:
 Nutana, Saskatoon, a neighbourhood in the center of the city of Saskatoon, Saskatchewan, Canada
 Nutana Park, Saskatoon, a residential neighbourhood in south-central Saskatoon
 Nutana Suburban Centre, Saskatoon, a mixed-use neighbourhood in southeast Saskatoon
 Nutana SDA, Saskatoon, a suburban development area (planning district) on the east side of Saskatoon
 Saskatoon Nutana, a provincial electoral district in Saskatchewan